The following is a list of Finnish film directors and producers.

A

Veikko Aaltonen
Heikki Aho (1895-1961)
Antero Alli
Marko Antila
Ritva Arvelo (1921-2013)
Khadar Ayderus Ahmed

B

Peter von Bagh (1943-2014)
Eija-Elina Bergholm
Zaida Bergroth
Hassan Blasim
Erik Blomberg (1913-1996)

D

Jörn Donner (1933-2020)

E

Esko Elstelä (1931-2007)
Anna Eriksson

F

Pauliina Feodoroff
Kyllikki Forssell (1925-2019)
Vivi Friedman (1967-2012)

G

Juhan af Grann

H

Simo Halinen
Alli Haapasalo
Carl von Haartman (1897-1980)
Roland af Hällström (1905-1956)
Arto Halonen
Jari Halonen
Renny Harlin
Klaus Härö
Jalmari Helander
Hanna Hemilä
Pirjo Honkasalo
Laura Hyppönen

I

Misko Iho
Ansa Ikonen (1913-1989)
Matti Ijäs

J

Kira Jääskeläinen
Tero Jartti
Risto Jarva (1934–1977)
Ilkka Järvi-Laturi
Antti Jokinen
Kaija Juurikkala

K

Pekka Karjalainen
Erkki Karu (1887-1935)
Dome Karukoski
Matti Kassila (1924-2018)
Aki Kaurismäki
Mika Kaurismäki
Erkko Kivikoski (1936-2005)
Timo Koivusalo
Ere Kokkonen (1938-2008)
Petri Kotwica
Alexis Kouros
Juho Kuosmanen
Maunu Kurkvaara

L

Edvin Laine (1905-1989)
Katariina Lahti
Maarit Lalli
Jarmo Lampela
Markku Lehmuskallio
PV Lehtinen
Virke Lehtinen
Pekka Lehto
Juha Lehtola
Pekka Lehtosaari
Hannu Leminen (1910-1997)
Perttu Leppä
Glory Leppänen (1901-1979)
Åke Lindman (1928-2009)
Armand Lohikoski (1912–2005)
Aku Louhimies

M

William Markus (1917-1989)
Aleksi Mäkelä
Taru Mäkelä
Aito Mäkinen (1927-2017)
Visa Mäkinen
Auli Mantila
Pekka Milonoff
Rauni Mollberg
Taneli Mustonen

N

Mikko Niskanen (1929-1990)
Yrjö Norta (1904-1988)
Jorma Nortimo (1906-1958)
Kaarlo Nuorvala (1910-1967)
Lauri Nurkse

O

Risto Orko (1899–2001)

P

Teuvo Pakkala (1862-1925)
Jaakko Pakkasvirta (1934-2018)
Pekka Parikka (1939-1997)
Heikki Partanen (1942-1990)
Spede Pasanen (1930–2001)
Antti Peippo (1934-1989)
Hjalmar V. Pohjanheimo (1867-1936)
Ilppo Pohjola
Markku Pölönen
Teuvo Puro (1884-1956)
Timo Puustinen

R

Harri J. Rantala
Mari Rantasila
Marjut Rimminen
Diana Ringo 
Pete Riski
Mika Ronkainen

S

Olli Saarela
Aleksi Salmenperä
Ville Salminen (1908-1992)
Toivo Särkkä (1890-1975)
JP Siili
Paul-Anders Simma
Olli Soinio (1948-2018)
Björn Soldan (1902-1953)
Mauritz Stiller (1883–1928)

T

Mika Taanila
Konrad Tallroth (1872-1926)
Nyrki Tapiovaara (1911-1940)
Aarne Tarkas (1923-1976)
Pia Tikka
Pamela Tola
Lauri Törhönen
Samuli Torssonen
Teuvo Tulio (1912-2000)

U

Ilmari Unho (1906-1961)

V

Valentin Vaala (1909-1976)
Kari Väänänen
Vanessa Vandy
Hannes Vartiainen and Pekka Veikkolainen
Pihla Viitala
Selma Vilhunen
Jukka Virtanen (1933-2019)
Johanna Vuoksenmaa
Timo Vuorensola

W

Jack Witikka (1916-2002)
Casper Wrede (1929–1998) – also theatre and TV director

References

See also

 Cinema of Finland
 List of Finns

Lists of film directors by nationality
Directors
Finnish film directors